Sandra Stephany "Fany" Mayor Gutiérrez (born 23 September 1991) is a Mexican footballer who plays as a forward for Liga MX Femenil club Tigres UANL and the Mexico women's national team.

Early life
Mayor is from Azcapotzalco, an industrial suburb of Mexico City.  She played on boy's teams growing up and later on Mexican youth national teams.

Playing career

Collegiate
Mayor played for Universidad de las Américas Puebla.

Úrvalsdeild
Mayor signed for Icelandic Úrvalsdeild kvenna team Þór/KA in February 2016. On September 28, 2017, she won the Icelandic championship with Þór/KA after defeating FH, in the last game of the season, 2–0 with goals from Sandra Jessen and herself. After the game, Mayor was named as the player of the season.

On April 24, she helped Þór/KA win the 2018 League Cup. On April 29, she scored one goal in Þór/KA's 3–0 victory against ÍBV women's football in the Icelandic Super Cup.

International
In international competitions she played in the Women's 2011 World Cup in Germany where she represented Mexico against England, Japan, and New Zealand.  In the Women's World Cup she scored in the game against New Zealand in the 2nd minute to open the scoring. In October 2017, she had a total of 55 international cups and 10 goals.

Personal life
In June 2016, fellow Mexico women's national teammate Bianca Sierra announced publicly that she had a relationship with Mayor. Mayor and Sierra are believed to be the first openly gay athletes in Mexican history. Previously, in 2015, Mexican coach, Leonardo Cuellar, had warned Mayor and Sierra to avoid any "stunts" or "holding hands". In 2016, Mayor was not selected by Cuellar to play for the Mexico national team and Sierra declined to play on the national team. Mayor departed Mexico to play in Iceland. Sierra later joined her in Iceland.

Mayor rejoined the Mexico national team, under new coach Roberto Medina, for a friendly match against Venezuela on June 10, 2017. Sierra rejoined the national team shortly thereafter.

International goals
Scores and results list Mexico's goal tally first.

See also

 List of Mexican Fútbol (soccer) athletes

References

External links
 
 
 
 Stephany Mayor at Tigres UANL Femenil
 
 
 

1991 births
Living people
Women's association football midfielders
Mexican women's footballers
Footballers from Mexico City
Mexico women's international footballers
2011 FIFA Women's World Cup players
2015 FIFA Women's World Cup players
Pan American Games medalists in football
Pan American Games bronze medalists for Mexico
Footballers at the 2011 Pan American Games
Footballers at the 2015 Pan American Games
Footballers at the 2019 Pan American Games
Universiade silver medalists for Mexico
Universiade medalists in football
Stephany Mayor
Stephany Mayor
Mexican expatriate women's footballers
Mexican expatriate sportspeople in Iceland
Expatriate women's footballers in Iceland
Lesbian sportswomen
LGBT association football players
Mexican LGBT sportspeople
Medalists at the 2013 Summer Universiade
Medalists at the 2011 Pan American Games
Medalists at the 2015 Pan American Games
Liga MX Femenil players
Mexican footballers